PTG or ptg may refer to:

.ptg, the file type used by ArtRage
Piano Technicians Guild
Police Tactical Group
PPP1R3C, a protein phosphatase 1 targeting subunit
Post-traumatic growth